Anton Shramchenko (born 12 March 1993) is a Belarusian footballer who plays for Shakhtyor Soligorsk.

Honours
Shakhtyor Soligorsk
Belarusian Super Cup winner: 2023

References

External links
 
 Profile at Belshina website

1993 births
Living people
Belarusian footballers
Association football forwards
FC Dnepr Mogilev players
FC Belshina Bobruisk players
FC Dinamo Minsk players
FC Gomel players
FC Minsk players
FC Shakhtyor Soligorsk players